The Museum of Romani Culture (Muzeum romské kultury in Czech) is an institution dedicated to the history and culture of the Romani people (Gypsies). It is situated in Brno, Czech Republic.

History
The Museum was founded in 1991 by members of the Czech Romani intelligentsia, led by Jana Horváthová, in the period of freedom which followed the Velvet Revolution in Czechoslovakia. During its early years, its location moved from one place to another and the institution struggled with financial problems. In December 2000, it moved to its present building on Bratislavská Street in Brno, which is the centre of the local Romani community. The museum is now financed from the state budget.

On December 1, 2005, the first permanent exhibition was opened.

Exhibitions

The permanent exhibition covers 6 rooms with an area of 326 m2. It is dedicated to the life, culture, and important events of the Romanis during their migration from India until the present day, with emphasis on the situation in Czech lands during the period 1945–1989.

Temporary exhibitions, mostly art and photography, are created from time to time.

In addition to the exhibitions, the museum is also a place of Romani research in Central Europe. With a public library, students and other interested people have a chance to select from more than 3,000 publications (books, magazines, CDs). The museum organizes lectures, concerts, panel debates and Romany language courses for the public and professionals. In the afternoon the club is opened for Romani children from the neighbourhood.

The Museum of Romani Culture constantly organizes various thematic exhibitions, e.g. Roma in Czechoslovakia (1992), Roma in the City of Brno (1996), Searching for Home (1999), The World through the Eyes of the Roma (1997–2005), The Story of the Roma (2011), Media Image of the Roma from the 19th century to the present (2013), Gypsy Myth (2014), World without Borders. Roma and Sport (2014), Roma Treasure (2016). In 2017, it was a temporary photographic exhibition by Nino Nihad Pušija Parno Gras and an exhibition Without Hate? HateFree ?. In cooperation with the Moravian Gallery, the Museum of Romani Culture has prepared the exhibition The Universe is Black in the Governor's Palace. In 2018, the museum prepared an exhibition by Mire Sveti / Světy Andrej Pešta and Ceija Stojka.

Library
The library sources include important research papers and prints, Romani literature, news articles in Czech and Slovakian (regarding to Roma), news articles about Roma in foreign languages, overview of legislations, printed discussions and debates.

Roma and Sinti Center in Prague 
In September 2020, the newly emerging specialized workplace of the museum was introduced - the Roma and Sinti Center in Prague. The first center of this type in the capital is to become a space for education and exhibition activities and will function as an information center and a place for community and social gatherings. It will be built in a First Republic villa in Prague's Dejvice at Velvarská 1. The Museum of Romani Culture has been the administrator of the building since 2019. The family house was designed by architects Arnošt (Ernst) Mühlstein and Victor Fürpro in 1937 for Leo František Perutz, a textile entrepreneur. The building will be renovated and purposefully completed, the work is expected to be completed in 2022. The center is to be opened on March 1, 2023.

See also
 Romani society and culture

References

External links
 The Museum of Romani Culture (Czech)

Other Romani museums:

 Documentation and Cultural Centre of German Sinti and Roma in Heidelberg, Germany (German, English)
 Ethnographic Museum in Tarnów, Poland. Click menu ROMA (CYGANIE) on the left. (Polish, English, Romany)

Museums established in 1991
Museum of Romani Culture
Museum of Romani Culture
Museums in Brno
History museums in the Czech Republic
Romani museums
1991 establishments in Czechoslovakia
20th-century architecture in the Czech Republic